United States v. Stewart, 311 U.S. 60 (1940), was a United States Supreme Court case expansively interpreting a definition of the term "income" for the purpose of tax liability.

External links
 

United States Supreme Court cases
United States Supreme Court cases of the Hughes Court
United States taxation and revenue case law
1940 in United States case law